The CNR Bonnet Carré Spillway-McComb Bridge is a  bridge that carries Canadian National Railway tracks over the Bonnet Carré Spillway and a portion of Lake Pontchartrain in St. Charles Parish and St. John the Baptist Parish. Its length makes it one of the longest bridges in the world.

The bridge is owned and maintained by the Canadian National Railway and is used by Amtrak passenger trains and Canadian National Railway freight trains.

In 2011, most likely due to debris hitting the bridge after the opening of the Bonnet Carré Spillway,  of the bridge was damaged and a bridge pier was dislodged.

The damaged segment was quickly rebuilt and reopened to rail traffic on February 20.

See also
List of bridges documented by the Historic American Engineering Record in Louisiana
List of bridges in the United States

References

External links
Canadian National Railway website

Railroad bridges in Louisiana
Canadian National Railway bridges in the United States
Historic American Engineering Record in Louisiana
Buildings and structures in St. Charles Parish, Louisiana
Buildings and structures in St. John the Baptist Parish, Louisiana
Transportation in St. Charles Parish, Louisiana
Transportation in St. John the Baptist Parish, Louisiana
Bridges completed in 1936
Trestle bridges in the United States
1936 establishments in Louisiana